Michael or Mike Hancock may refer to:

 Mike Hancock (Canadian politician), mayor of the city of Brantford, Ontario
 Mike Hancock (American football) (born 1950), American football player
 Michael Hancock (rugby league) (born 1969), Australian rugby league footballer
 Mike Hancock (British politician) (born 1946), British independent former Member of Parliament (MP), formerly Liberal Democrat and SDP
 Michael Hancock (Colorado politician) (born 1969),  mayor of Denver, Colorado